The Iranian Orchestra for New Music was founded by maestro Alireza Mashayekhi in 1995. The orchestra performs works using both Persian and non-Persian instruments.

Notes

References
Gluck, Bob. “A New East-West Synthesis: Conversations with Iranian Composer Alireza Mashayekhi.” eContact! 14.4 — TES 2011: Toronto Electroacoustic Symposium / Symposium électroacoustique de Toronto (March 2013). Montréal: CEC.

See also
Persian Symphonic Music
Tehran Symphony Orchestra
National Iranian Orchestra
Melal Orchestra (Nations Symphony Orchestra)

Musical groups established in 1995
New Music
New Music